Kissing the Ground You Walked On is a 2022 Macanese drama film directed by Hong Heng-fai. It received three nominations at the 59th Golden Horse Awards, including Best New Director for Hong Heng-fai. Hong became the first Macanese director to be nominated for the award. In an interview, Taipei Golden Horse Film Festival's Executive Committee head Wen Tien-hsiang described Hong's directorial style as "Ryusuke Hamaguchi meets Tsai Ming-liang".

Premise

Cast
 Wong Pak-hou
 Lam Sheung

Awards and nominations

References

External links

 
 

2022 films
2022 drama films
Macanese drama films
Films about writers
2020s Cantonese-language films
2022 directorial debut films